"Of Course I'm Alright" is a song written by Billy Kirsch, and recorded by American country music group Alabama.  It was released in October 1997 as the third single from the album Dancin' on the Boulevard.  The song reached number 22 on the Billboard Hot Country Singles & Tracks chart while it reached number 23 in Canada.

Chart performance

References

1997 singles
1997 songs
Alabama (American band) songs
Song recordings produced by Don Cook
RCA Records singles
Songs written by Billy Kirsch